Antonio Ripa (1718-1795) was a Spanish composer.

Works and recordings
Antonio Ripa (1718-1795). Música en la Catedral de Sevilla. M. Hinojosa, soprano; L. Mancini, mezzo-soprano; M. Mediano, tenor Enrico Onofri Orquesta Barroca de Sevilla OBS Prometeo 009

References

1718 births
1795 deaths